The 8e Escadre de Chasse 8e EC or 8th Fighter Wing is a fighter formation of the Fighter Brigade of the French Air and Space Force, which was reformed on 25 August 2015 at Cazaux Air Base.

The unit has known previously various periods of activity:
 On Aerial Base 108 Marignane, between 1 January 1936 and 1 May 1939;
 In Indochina, between 16 January 1951 and 27 July 1954;
 In Morocco, on Aerial Base 151 Rabat-Salé, between 1 August 1955 and November 1960
 In Algeria on the base of Oran La Senia between November 1960 and July 1961 
 At Nancy Ochey between July 1961 and 1 December 1961
 At Cazaux, between 1 February 1964 and 1 July 1993.

Composition 
 Escadron de Transition Opérationnelle 1/8 Saintonge
 Escadron de Transition Opérationnelle 2/8 Nice
 Escadron d'Entraînement 3/8 Côte d'Or
 Escadron de Soutien Technique Aéronautique 15/8 Pilat

Escadrons/Squadrons history

The 8e Escadre possesses two historical squadrons, the "Saintonge" and "Nice". The squadron "Languedoc" was attached to the Escadre during ten years.

Before WWII 

 Hunter Group - Groupe de Chasse I/8 : from 1 January 1936 until 1 May 1939
Groupe de Chasse II/8 : from 1 January 1936 and 1 May 1939

Escadron/Squadron "Saintonge" 

 Groupe Mixte I/8 Saintonge : from 16 January 1951 until 27 July 1954  
 Hunter Squadron Escadron de Chasse 1/8 Saintonge : from 9 September 1960 until 1 December 1961, and from 1 February 1964 until 31 July 1993

Escadron/Squadron "Languedoc"
 Groupe de Chasse II/8 Languedoc : from 1 August 1951 until 27 July 1954 
 Escadron de chasse 2/8 Languedoc : from 1 August 1955 until 1 December 1961

Escadron/Squadron "Maghreb" 
 Escadron de Chasse 1/8 Maghreb : from 1 August 1955 until September 1960

Escadron/Squadron "Nice"
 Escadron de Chasse 2/8 Nice :  from 1 February 1964 until 31 July 1993

Bases

 Aerial Base 108 Marigane: from 1 January 1936 until 1 May 1939 
 Indochina : from 16 January 1951 until 27 July 1954 
 Aerial Base 151 Rabat-Salé: from 1 August 1955 until the beginning of 1960 
 Aerial Base Nancy-Ochey : from the beginning of 1960 until 1 December 1961
 Aerial Base 120 Cazaux : from 1 February 1964 until 31 July 1993, and as of 25 August 2015

Equipment 

 Morane-Saulnier MS.225 : from 1 January 1936 until 1 January 1939 
 Dewoitine D.500 : from 1 January 1936 until 1 January 1939 
 Dewoitine D.510 : from 1 January 1939 until 1 May 1939 
 Republic P-47D Thunderbolt : from 16 January 1951 until 27 July 1954 
 Grumman F8F-1B Bearcat : from 16 January 1951 until 27 July 1954  
 Mistral : from 1 August 1955 until 1959 
 Dassault Mystère IVA : from June 1959 until 1 December 1961, and from 1 February 1964 until 1982 
 Alpha Jet: from October 1982 until 31 July 1993, and as of 25 August 2015

See also

Major (France)
Patrouille de France
Chief of Staff of the French Air Force
List of Escadres of the French Air Force

References

Military units and formations of the French Air and Space Force
Fighter aircraft units and formations
Military units and formations established in 2015